Democrat William Proxmire won a special election to fill the vacancy created by the death of Senator Joseph R. McCarthy (R-WI). Also, Price Daniel (D-TX) left the Senate to become governor of Texas, and Democrat Ralph Yarborough won a special election for that Senate seat. The Democrats thus made a net gain of one seat. However, Congress was out of session at the time of the Democratic gain in Wisconsin, and the Republicans gained a Democratic-held seat only weeks after the next session started, when Republican John D. Hoblitzell Jr. was appointed to fill the vacancy created by the death of Senator Matthew M. Neely (D-WV).

Race summary 

Ordered by election date.

Texas 

One-term Democrat Price Daniel resigned January 14, 1957 to become Governor of Texas.  Daniel appointed Democrat William A. Blakley January 15, 1957.

In 1956, Allan Shivers opted not to run for a fourth term as Governor of Texas; Senator Price Daniel, as a sitting U.S. Senator was elected Governor of Texas.

Like his gubernatorial predecessor Allan Shivers and Daniel, Blakley was an "Eisenhower Democrat" who had supported Dwight Eisenhower over the national Democratic Party candidate Adlai Stevenson in 1952 and 1956.

Blakley, who had gained prominence in Texas politics for his business successes was, at the time, building a $125 million shopping center and a 1,000-room hotel in Dallas. Governor Shivers, who had been considering appointing a Republican candidate to the Senate seat, instead named Blakley to the United States Senate pending a special election for the seat.

Pressured by the Democratic Party in the interests of cooling tensions from the gubernatorial election, Blakley did not seek the remaining term as senator. He hence served for fewer than four months from January 15 to April 28. Ralph Yarborough succeeded him in the special election, winning with a plurality of the vote when the conservatives divided three ways.

Thereafter, Texas law was changed to require a runoff between the two leading candidates in a special election if no one had a majority in the first round). Blakley left the Senate saying "I shall go back to my boots and saddle and ride toward the Western sunset."

Yarborough would be re-elected in 1958 and again in 1964.

Wisconsin 

 
 

|-
| 
| colspan=5 |Democratic gain from Republican
|-

Two-term Republican Joseph McCarthy died May 2, 1957. In the summer of 1957, a special election was held to fill McCarthy's seat. In the primaries, voters in both parties turned away from McCarthy's legacy. The Republican primary was won by Walter J. Kohler Jr., who called for a clean break from McCarthy's approach; he defeated former Congressman Glenn Robert Davis, who charged that Eisenhower was soft on Communism. The Democratic candidate, William Proxmire, called the late McCarthy "a disgrace to Wisconsin, to the Senate, and to America". On August 27, Proxmire won the election, serving in the seat for 32 years.

Proxmire would be re-elected five more times, serving until his retirement in 1989.

See also 
 1957 United States House of Representatives elections

References 

 
1957